Al Akram Mosque  is a mosque in Kampung Datuk Keramat, Kuala Lumpur, Malaysia.

See also
 Islam in Malaysia
GoogleMaps StreetView of Masjid Al-Akram Datuk Keramat

References

Mosques in Kuala Lumpur